Charles Sawyer may refer to:

Charles E. Sawyer (1860–1924), personal physician to President Warren G. Harding
Charles Henry Sawyer (photographer) (1868–1954), American painter and photographer
Charles H. Sawyer (politician) (1840–1908), governor of New Hampshire
Charles H. Sawyer (neuroendocrinologist) (1915–2006), American neuroendocrinologist
Charles J. Sawyer (1876–1931), London bookseller
Charles Manville Sawyer (1876–1950), first governor (president) of the Federal Reserve Bank of Kansas City
Charles Sawyer (sportsman) (1856–1921),  English cricketer and rugby union footballer
Charles W. Sawyer (pilot), American World War II fighter ace
Charles W. Sawyer (1887–1979), Secretary of Commerce during the administration of President Harry S. Truman; U.S. ambassador to Belgium and Luxembourg
Charles B. Sawyer, inventor of the commercial quartz crystal manufacturing process